Mario Bossi (born January 23, 1909 in Rome) was an Italian professional football player.

He played 4 seasons (22 games, no goals) in the Serie A for A.S. Roma and Sampierdarenese.

1909 births
Year of death missing
Italian footballers
Serie A players
A.S. Roma players
U.C. Sampdoria players
Calcio Lecco 1912 players
Association football midfielders